The Nokia Morph is a concept mobile phone created by Finnish company Nokia in collaboration with the University of Cambridge in Great Britain and is based on nanotechnology. The project was postponed indefinitely due to the sale of Nokia’s mobile phone division.

Launched along with the Museum of Modern Art “Design and the Elastic Mind” exposition, the Nokia Morph concept device is a bridge between very advanced technology and its possible benefits for end users. This device was the product of a joint study into the future of mobile phones by the Nokia Research Center (NRC) in collaboration with the Cambridge Nanoscience Center (United Kingdom) and represents nanoscale technology that could potentially create a world of radically different devices that open a completely new spectrum of possibilities. According to Bob Iannucci, Nokia's chief technology officer, the "Nokia Research Center is looking at ways to reinvent the form and function of mobile devices... The Morph concept shows what might be possible."

The device, which is non-functional, is intended to provide a conceptual showcase for future applications of nanotechnology in the realm of consumer electronics. It was planned to be a flexible phone that could be both stretched and folded into numerous shapes, and, in this way, it could comfortably carry out its many functions: it could convert into a panel large enough to view high quality videos, fold up to fit into small pockets, and bend to be worn around the wrist or held up to the face. Another interesting aspect of the device is that it would clean itself and be semi-transparent, allowing the device to be see-through yet functional. Furthermore, it would have many extra functions that would contribute to making this device look like something out of a science-fiction movie. Some of these functions include the ability to analyze the air near food or other elements to verify that they are in good condition or to take different colors to adjust the outfit of the user in order to convert it into a popular style. In conclusion, the Nokia Morph is a very ambitious project. This device seems to have potential for a new revolution in cell phone technology. 

Nokia released a computer-generated video demonstrating the capabilities the Morph might have if it were a real mobile phone. The manufacturer believed that some of the device's imagined features could appear in high-end devices by 2015.

Characteristics 

 New configuration of flexible and transparent materials blends seamlessly with the way in which we live
 Self-cleaning device which automatically preserves its electronic transparency offers a completely new aesthetic dimension
 Built-in solar absorption functionality could charge the device as well as allowing the batteries to become smaller, more durable, and faster to charge
 Integrated sensors could allow us to learn more about the environment around us, enabling us to make better decisions

In addition to the previously mentioned advances, the integrated electronics shown in the Morph concept could cost less while having greater functionality in a much smaller space, even as interfaces are simplified and greater ease of use is achieved. All of these new capabilities will unleash new applications and services that will allow us to communicate and interact in unprecedented ways.

Flexible and adaptable design 
Nanotechnology allows for the creation of materials and components which are flexible, elastic, transparent, and remarkably strong. Fibril proteins are woven into a three-dimensional mesh which reinforces thin elastic structures. Using the same principle behind spider silk, this elasticity allows the device to literally change shapes and configure to suit the task at hand.

A folding design would easily fit into a pocket and could ergonomically lend itself to being used as a traditional phone. A larger unfolded design could show more detailed information and incorporate input devices such as keyboards and touch controls. 

Even integrated electronics from interconnections to sensors could share these flexible properties. Furthermore, the use of biodegradable materials could make the production and recycling of the devices easier and more environmentally friendly.

Self-cleaning 
Nanotechnology has also been harnessed to create self-cleaning surfaces on mobile devices, ultimately reducing corrosion, improving wear and tear, and increasing the longevity of improvement. Nanostructured surfaces such as “nanoflowers” which are observed in natural systems are incorporated for their ability to naturally repel water, dirt, and fingerprints.

Advanced energy sources 
Nanotechnology offers the possibility that a device’s surface will become a natural source of energy through a layer of “nanograss” structures that collect solar energy. At the same time, new high-density energy storage materials allow batteries to become smaller and thinner as well as faster to recharge and able to endure more charge cycles.

Environmental protection 
Nanosensors would allow users to examine the surrounding environment in entirely new ways from analyzing air pollution to gaining insight into traces of biochemicals and their processes. The new capabilities can be as complex as helping monitor the evolution of conditions in the quality of our environment or as simple as knowing if the fruit we are about to enjoy should be washed before eating it. Our ability to tune into our environment in this way can help us make key decisions that guide our daily actions and ultimately improve our health.

References

External links 
 Nokia's page describing the Morph concept
 Nokia Morph demonstration video
 A review of the Nokia Morph
 Cnet: Nokia demos bendable cell phone 
 Nokia 888 is an earlier design flexible mobile device concept by Tamer Nakisci, which won the Nokia Benelux Design Awards in 2005.

Morph
Personal digital assistants
Flexible displays